Basilios "Bill" Stellios (born 16 April 1959) is an Australian former weightlifter. He competed at the 1980 Summer Olympics and the 1984 Summer Olympics.

References

External links
 

1959 births
Living people
Australian male weightlifters
Olympic weightlifters of Australia
Weightlifters at the 1980 Summer Olympics
Weightlifters at the 1984 Summer Olympics
Place of birth missing (living people)
Commonwealth Games medallists in weightlifting
Commonwealth Games gold medallists for Australia
Commonwealth Games silver medallists for Australia
Weightlifters at the 1978 Commonwealth Games
Weightlifters at the 1982 Commonwealth Games
Weightlifters at the 1986 Commonwealth Games
20th-century Australian people
21st-century Australian people
Medallists at the 1978 Commonwealth Games
Medallists at the 1982 Commonwealth Games
Medallists at the 1986 Commonwealth Games